The Oxford Journal of Legal Studies is a legal journal published by Oxford University Press on behalf of the Faculty of Law, University of Oxford.

According to the Journal Citation Reports, the journal has a 2018 impact factor of 1.083, ranking it 75th out of 148 journals in the category "Law". With a combined score of 4.3, the journal is ranked 3rd out of 85 in the category of refereed "General" Law journals by the W&L Law Journal Rankings.

See also
English law
Law of the United Kingdom
List of law journals

References

External links 
 

British law journals
General law journals
Quarterly journals
Publications established in 1981
Oxford University Press academic journals
English-language journals